Moteane John Melamu is a writer and academic from Botswana. He is a professor at the University of Botswana.

Works
Children of the Twilight, short stories 
Living and Partly Living, short stories

External links
Brief mention from AEAA
Bookfinder
Non-English site

Year of birth missing (living people)
Botswana male writers
Living people
Academic staff of the University of Botswana
Botswana short story writers
Male short story writers